Dynamic programming is both a mathematical optimization method and a computer programming method. The method was developed by Richard Bellman in the 1950s and has found applications in numerous fields, from aerospace engineering to economics.

In both contexts it refers to simplifying a complicated problem by breaking it down into simpler sub-problems in a recursive manner. While some decision problems cannot be taken apart this way, decisions that span several points in time do often break apart recursively. Likewise, in computer science, if a problem can be solved optimally by breaking it into sub-problems and then recursively finding the optimal solutions to the sub-problems, then it is said to have optimal substructure.

If sub-problems can be nested recursively inside larger problems, so that dynamic programming methods are applicable, then there is a relation between the value of the larger problem and the values of the sub-problems. In the optimization literature this relationship is called the Bellman equation.

Overview

Mathematical optimization 
In terms of mathematical optimization, dynamic programming usually refers to simplifying a decision by breaking it down into a sequence of decision steps over time. This is done by defining a sequence of value functions V1, V2, ..., Vn taking y as an argument representing the state of the system at times i from 1 to n. The definition of Vn(y) is the value obtained in state y at the last time n. The values Vi at earlier times i = n −1, n − 2, ..., 2, 1 can be found by working backwards, using a recursive relationship called the Bellman equation. For i = 2, ..., n, Vi−1 at any state y is calculated from Vi by maximizing a simple function (usually the sum) of the gain from a decision at time i − 1 and the function Vi at the new state of the system if this decision is made. Since Vi has already been calculated for the needed states, the above operation yields Vi−1 for those states. Finally, V1 at the initial state of the system is the value of the optimal solution. The optimal values of the decision variables can be recovered, one by one, by tracking back the calculations already performed.

Control theory 
In control theory, a typical problem is to find an admissible control  which causes the system  to follow an admissible trajectory  on a continuous time interval  that minimizes a cost function
 
The solution to this problem is an optimal control law or policy , which produces an optimal trajectory  and a cost-to-go function . The latter obeys the fundamental equation of dynamic programming:

In practice, this generally requires numerical techniques for some discrete approximation to the exact optimization relationship.

Alternatively, the continuous process can be approximated by a discrete system, which leads to a following recurrence relation analog to the Hamilton–Jacobi–Bellman equation:

This functional equation is known as the Bellman equation, which can be solved for an exact solution of the discrete approximation of the optimization equation.

Example from economics: Ramsey's problem of optimal saving 

In economics, the objective is generally to maximize (rather than minimize) some dynamic social welfare function. In Ramsey's problem, this function relates amounts of consumption to levels of utility. Loosely speaking, the planner faces the trade-off between contemporaneous consumption and future consumption (via investment in capital stock that is used in production), known as intertemporal choice. Future consumption is discounted at a constant rate . A discrete approximation to the transition equation of capital is given by

An initial capital stock  is assumed.

Let  be consumption in period , and assume consumption yields utility  as long as the consumer lives. Assume the consumer is impatient, so that he discounts future utility by a factor  each period, where . Let  be capital in period . Assume capital cannot be negative. Then the consumer's decision problem can be written as follows:

Written this way, the problem looks complicated, because it involves solving for all the choice variables . (The capital  is not a choice variable—the consumer's initial capital is taken as given.)

The dynamic programming approach to solve this problem involves breaking it apart into a sequence of smaller decisions. There is (by assumption) no utility from having capital after death, .

The value of any quantity of capital at any previous time can be calculated by backward induction using the Bellman equation. In this problem, for each , the Bellman equation is

  subject to 

Intuitively, instead of choosing his whole lifetime plan at birth, the consumer can take things one step at a time. At time , his current capital  is given, and he only needs to choose current consumption  and saving .

To actually solve this problem, we work backwards.

Working backwards, it can be shown that the value function at time  is

 

where each  is a constant, and the optimal amount to consume at time  is

 

which can be simplified to

 

We see that it is optimal to consume a larger fraction of current wealth as one gets older, finally consuming all remaining wealth in period , the last period of life.

Computer programming 
There are two key attributes that a problem must have in order for dynamic programming to be applicable: optimal substructure and overlapping sub-problems. If a problem can be solved by combining optimal solutions to non-overlapping sub-problems, the strategy is called "divide and conquer" instead.  This is why merge sort and quick sort are not classified as dynamic programming problems.

Optimal substructure means that the solution to a given optimization problem can be obtained by the combination of optimal solutions to its sub-problems. Such optimal substructures are usually described by means of recursion. For example, given a graph G=(V,E), the shortest path p from a vertex u to a vertex v exhibits optimal substructure: take any intermediate vertex w on this shortest path p. If p is truly the shortest path, then it can be split into sub-paths p1 from u to w and p2 from w to v such that these, in turn, are indeed the shortest paths between the corresponding vertices (by the simple cut-and-paste argument described in Introduction to Algorithms). Hence, one can easily formulate the solution for finding shortest paths in a recursive manner, which is what the Bellman–Ford algorithm or the Floyd–Warshall algorithm does.

Overlapping sub-problems means that the space of sub-problems must be small, that is, any recursive algorithm solving the problem should solve the same sub-problems over and over, rather than generating new sub-problems. For example, consider the recursive formulation for generating the Fibonacci series: Fi = Fi−1 + Fi−2, with base case F1 = F2 = 1. Then F43 = F42 + F41, and F42 = F41 + F40. Now F41 is being solved in the recursive sub-trees of both F43 as well as F42. Even though the total number of sub-problems is actually small (only 43 of them), we end up solving the same problems over and over if we adopt a naive recursive solution such as this. Dynamic programming takes account of this fact and solves each sub-problem only once.

This can be achieved in either of two ways:

 Top-down approach: This is the direct fall-out of the recursive formulation of any problem. If the solution to any problem can be formulated recursively using the solution to its sub-problems, and if its sub-problems are overlapping, then one can easily memoize or store the solutions to the sub-problems in a table. Whenever we attempt to solve a new sub-problem, we first check the table to see if it is already solved. If a solution has been recorded, we can use it directly, otherwise we solve the sub-problem and add its solution to the table.
 Bottom-up approach: Once we formulate the solution to a problem recursively as in terms of its sub-problems, we can try reformulating the problem in a bottom-up fashion: try solving the sub-problems first and use their solutions to build-on and arrive at solutions to bigger sub-problems. This is also usually done in a tabular form by iteratively generating solutions to bigger and bigger sub-problems by using the solutions to small sub-problems. For example, if we already know the values of F41 and F40, we can directly calculate the value of F42.

Some programming languages can automatically memoize the result of a function call with a particular set of arguments, in order to speed up call-by-name evaluation (this mechanism is referred to as call-by-need). Some languages make it possible portably (e.g. Scheme, Common Lisp, Perl or D). Some languages have automatic memoization  built in, such as tabled Prolog and J, which supports memoization with the M. adverb. In any case, this is only possible for a referentially transparent function. Memoization is also encountered as an easily accessible design pattern within term-rewrite based languages such as Wolfram Language.

Bioinformatics 
Dynamic programming is widely used in bioinformatics for tasks such as sequence alignment, protein folding, RNA structure prediction and protein-DNA binding. The first dynamic programming algorithms for protein-DNA binding were developed in the 1970s independently by Charles DeLisi in USA and Georgii Gurskii and Alexander Zasedatelev in USSR. Recently these algorithms have become very popular in bioinformatics and computational biology, particularly in the studies of nucleosome positioning and transcription factor binding.

Examples: computer algorithms

Dijkstra's algorithm for the shortest path problem 
From a dynamic programming point of view, Dijkstra's algorithm for the shortest path problem  is a successive approximation scheme that solves the dynamic programming functional equation for the shortest path problem by the Reaching method.

In fact, Dijkstra's explanation of the logic behind the algorithm, namely

is a paraphrasing of Bellman's famous Principle of Optimality in the context of the shortest path problem.

Fibonacci sequence 
Using dynamic programming in the calculation of the nth member of the Fibonacci sequence improves its performance greatly. Here is a naïve implementation, based directly on the mathematical definition:

 function fib(n)
     if n <= 1 return n
     return fib(n − 1) + fib(n − 2)

Notice that if we call, say, fib(5), we produce a call tree that calls the function on the same value many different times:

 fib(5)
 fib(4) + fib(3)
 (fib(3) + fib(2)) + (fib(2) + fib(1))
 ((fib(2) + fib(1)) + (fib(1) + fib(0))) + ((fib(1) + fib(0)) + fib(1))
 (((fib(1) + fib(0)) + fib(1)) + (fib(1) + fib(0))) + ((fib(1) + fib(0)) + fib(1))

In particular, fib(2) was calculated three times from scratch. In larger examples, many more values of fib, or subproblems, are recalculated, leading to an exponential time algorithm.

Now, suppose we have a simple map object, m, which maps each value of fib that has already been calculated to its result, and we modify our function to use it and update it. The resulting function requires only O(n) time instead of exponential time (but requires O(n) space):

 var m := map(0 → 0, 1 → 1)
 function fib(n)
     if key n is not in map m 
         m[n] := fib(n − 1) + fib(n − 2)
     return m[n]

This technique of saving values that have already been calculated is called memoization;  this is the top-down approach, since we first break the problem into subproblems and then calculate and store values.

In the bottom-up approach, we calculate the smaller values of fib first, then build larger values from them. This method also uses O(n) time since it contains a loop that repeats n − 1 times, but it only takes constant (O(1)) space, in contrast to the top-down approach which requires O(n) space to store the map.

 function fib(n)
     if n = 0
         return 0
     else
         var previousFib := 0, currentFib := 1
         repeat n − 1 times // loop is skipped if n = 1
             var newFib := previousFib + currentFib
             previousFib := currentFib
             currentFib  := newFib
         return currentFib

In both examples, we only calculate fib(2) one time, and then use it to calculate both fib(4) and fib(3), instead of computing it every time either of them is evaluated.

A type of balanced 0–1 matrix 

Consider the problem of assigning values, either zero or one, to the positions of an  matrix, with  even, so that each row and each column contains exactly  zeros and  ones. We ask how many different assignments there are for a given . For example, when , five possible solutions are

There are at least three possible approaches: brute force, backtracking, and dynamic programming.

Brute force consists of checking all assignments of zeros and ones and counting those that have balanced rows and columns ( zeros and  ones).

Backtracking for this problem consists of choosing some order of the matrix elements and recursively placing ones or zeros, while checking that in every row and column the number of elements that have not been assigned plus the number of ones or zeros are both at least . While more sophisticated than brute force, this approach will visit every solution once, making it impractical for  larger than six, since the number of solutions is already 116,963,796,250 for  = 8, as we shall see.

Dynamic programming makes it possible to count the number of solutions without visiting them all. Imagine backtracking values for the first row – what information would we require about the remaining rows, in order to be able to accurately count the solutions obtained for each first row value? We consider  boards, where , whose  rows contain  zeros and  ones. The function f to which memoization is applied maps vectors of n pairs of integers to the number of admissible boards (solutions). There is one pair for each column, and its two components indicate respectively the number of zeros and ones that have yet to be placed in that column. The process of subproblem creation involves iterating over every one of   possible assignments for the top row of the board, and going through every column, subtracting one from the appropriate element of the pair for that column, depending on whether the assignment for the top row contained a zero or a one at that position. If any one of the results is negative, then the assignment is invalid and does not contribute to the set of solutions (recursion stops). Otherwise, we have an assignment for the top row of the  board and recursively compute the number of solutions to the remaining  board, adding the numbers of solutions for every admissible assignment of the top row and returning the sum, which is being memoized. The base case is the trivial subproblem, which occurs for a  board.

For example, in the first two boards shown above the sequences of vectors would be
((2, 2) (2, 2) (2, 2) (2, 2))       ((2, 2) (2, 2) (2, 2) (2, 2))     k = 4
  0      1      0      1              0      0      1      1

((1, 2) (2, 1) (1, 2) (2, 1))       ((1, 2) (1, 2) (2, 1) (2, 1))     k = 3
  1      0      1      0              0      0      1      1

((1, 1) (1, 1) (1, 1) (1, 1))       ((0, 2) (0, 2) (2, 0) (2, 0))     k = 2
  0      1      0      1              1      1      0      0

((0, 1) (1, 0) (0, 1) (1, 0))       ((0, 1) (0, 1) (1, 0) (1, 0))     k = 1
  1      0      1      0              1      1      0      0

((0, 0) (0, 0) (0, 0) (0, 0))       ((0, 0) (0, 0), (0, 0) (0, 0))

The number of solutions  is

Links to the MAPLE implementation of the dynamic programming approach may be found among the external links.

Checkerboard 

Consider a checkerboard with n × n squares and a cost function c(i, j) which returns a cost associated with square (i,j) (i being the row, j being the column). For instance (on a 5 × 5 checkerboard),

Thus c(1, 3) = 5

Let us say there was a checker that could start at any square on the first rank (i.e., row) and you wanted to know the shortest path (the sum of the minimum costs at each visited rank) to get to the last rank; assuming the checker could move only diagonally left forward, diagonally right forward, or straight forward. That is, a checker on (1,3) can move to (2,2), (2,3) or (2,4).

This problem exhibits optimal substructure. That is, the solution to the entire problem relies on solutions to subproblems. Let us define a function q(i, j) as

q(i, j) = the minimum cost to reach square (i, j).

Starting at rank n and descending to rank 1, we compute the value of this function for all the squares at each successive rank. Picking the square that holds the minimum value at each rank gives us the shortest path between rank n and rank 1.

The function q(i, j) is equal to the minimum cost to get to any of the three squares below it (since those are the only squares that can reach it) plus c(i, j). For instance:

 

Now, let us define q(i, j) in somewhat more general terms:

 

The first line of this equation deals with a board modeled as squares indexed on 1 at the lowest bound and n at the highest bound. The second line specifies what happens at the first rank; providing a base case. The third line, the recursion, is the important part. It represents the A,B,C,D terms in the example. From this definition we can derive straightforward recursive code for q(i, j). In the following pseudocode, n is the size of the board, c(i, j) is the cost function, and min() returns the minimum of a number of values:

 function minCost(i, j)
     if j < 1 or j > n
         return infinity
     else if i = 1
         return c(i, j)
     else
         return min( minCost(i-1, j-1), minCost(i-1, j), minCost(i-1, j+1) ) + c(i, j)

This function only computes the path cost, not the actual path. We discuss the actual path below. This, like the Fibonacci-numbers example, is horribly slow because it too exhibits the overlapping sub-problems attribute. That is, it recomputes the same path costs over and over. However, we can compute it much faster in a bottom-up fashion if we store path costs in a two-dimensional array q[i, j] rather than using a function. This avoids recomputation; all the values needed for array q[i, j] are computed ahead of time only once. Precomputed values for (i,j) are simply looked up whenever needed.

We also need to know what the actual shortest path is. To do this, we use another array p[i, j]; a predecessor array. This array records the path to any square s. The predecessor of s is modeled as an offset relative to the index (in q[i, j]) of the precomputed path cost of s. To reconstruct the complete path, we lookup the predecessor of s, then the predecessor of that square, then the predecessor of that square, and so on recursively, until we reach the starting square. Consider the following pseudocode:

 function computeShortestPathArrays()
     for x from 1 to n
         q[1, x] := c(1, x)
     for y from 1 to n
         q[y, 0]     := infinity
         q[y, n + 1] := infinity
     for y from 2 to n
         for x from 1 to n
             m := min(q[y-1, x-1], q[y-1, x], q[y-1, x+1])
             q[y, x] := m + c(y, x)
             if m = q[y-1, x-1]
                 p[y, x] := -1
             else if m = q[y-1, x]
                 p[y, x] :=  0
             else
                 p[y, x] :=  1

Now the rest is a simple matter of finding the minimum and printing it.

 function computeShortestPath()
     computeShortestPathArrays()
     minIndex := 1
     min := q[n, 1]
     for i from 2 to n
         if q[n, i] < min
             minIndex := i
             min := q[n, i]
     printPath(n, minIndex)

 function printPath(y, x)
     print(x)
     print("<-")
     if y = 2
         print(x + p[y, x])
     else
         printPath(y-1, x + p[y, x])

Sequence alignment 
In genetics, sequence alignment is an important application where dynamic programming is essential.  Typically, the problem consists of transforming one sequence into another using edit operations that replace, insert, or remove an element.  Each operation has an associated cost, and the goal is to find the sequence of edits with the lowest total cost.

The problem can be stated naturally as a recursion, a sequence A is optimally edited into a sequence B by either:

 inserting the first character of B, and performing an optimal alignment of A and the tail of B
 deleting the first character of A, and performing the optimal alignment of the tail of A and B
 replacing the first character of A with the first character of B, and performing optimal alignments of the tails of A and B.

The partial alignments can be tabulated in a matrix, where cell (i,j) contains the cost of the optimal alignment of A[1..i] to B[1..j].  The cost in cell (i,j) can be calculated by adding the cost of the relevant operations to the cost of its neighboring cells, and selecting the optimum.

Different variants exist, see Smith–Waterman algorithm and Needleman–Wunsch algorithm.

Tower of Hanoi puzzle 

The Tower of Hanoi or Towers of Hanoi is a mathematical game or puzzle. It consists of three rods, and a number of disks of different sizes which can slide onto any rod. The puzzle starts with the disks in a neat stack in ascending order of size on one rod, the smallest at the top, thus making a conical shape.

The objective of the puzzle is to move the entire stack to another rod, obeying the following rules:

 Only one disk may be moved at a time.
 Each move consists of taking the upper disk from one of the rods and sliding it onto another rod, on top of the other disks that may already be present on that rod.
 No disk may be placed on top of a smaller disk.

The dynamic programming solution consists of solving the functional equation

 S(n,h,t) = S(n-1,h, not(h,t)) ; S(1,h,t) ; S(n-1,not(h,t),t)

where n denotes the number of disks to be moved, h denotes the home rod, t denotes the target rod, not(h,t) denotes the third rod (neither h nor t), ";" denotes concatenation, and

 S(n, h, t) := solution to a problem consisting of n disks that are to be moved from rod h to rod t.

For n=1 the problem is trivial, namely S(1,h,t) = "move a disk from rod h to rod t" (there is only one disk left).

The  number of moves required by this solution is 2n − 1. If the objective is to maximize the number of moves (without cycling) then the dynamic programming functional equation  is slightly more complicated and  3n − 1 moves are required.

Egg dropping puzzle 
The following is a description of the instance of this famous puzzle involving N=2 eggs and a building with H=36 floors: 
Suppose that we wish to know which stories in a 36-story building are safe to drop eggs from, and which will cause the eggs to break on landing (using U.S. English terminology, in which the first floor is at ground level). We make a few assumptions:

 An egg that survives a fall can be used again.
 A broken egg must be discarded.
 The effect of a fall is the same for all eggs.
 If an egg breaks when dropped, then it would break if dropped from a higher window.
 If an egg survives a fall, then it would survive a shorter fall.
 It is not ruled out that the first-floor windows break eggs, nor is it ruled out that eggs can survive the 36th-floor windows.

 If only one egg is available and we wish to be sure of obtaining the right result, the experiment can be carried out in only one way. Drop the egg from the first-floor window; if it survives, drop it from the second-floor window. Continue upward until it breaks. In the worst case, this method may require 36 droppings. Suppose 2 eggs are available. What is the lowest number of egg-droppings that is guaranteed to work in all cases?

To derive a dynamic programming functional equation for this puzzle, let the state of the dynamic programming model be a pair s = (n,k), where

 n = number of test eggs available, n = 0, 1, 2, 3, ..., N − 1.
 k = number of (consecutive) floors yet to be tested, k = 0, 1, 2, ..., H − 1.

For instance, s = (2,6) indicates that two test eggs are available and 6 (consecutive) floors are yet to be tested. The initial state of the process is s = (N,H) where N denotes the number of test eggs available at the commencement of the experiment. The process terminates either when there are no more test eggs (n = 0) or when k = 0, whichever occurs first. If termination occurs at state s = (0,k) and k > 0, then the test failed.

Now, let

 W(n,k) = minimum number of trials required to identify the value of the critical floor under the worst-case scenario given that the process is in state s = (n,k).

Then it can be shown that

 W(n,k) = 1 + min{max(W(n − 1, x − 1), W(n,k − x)): x = 1, 2, ..., k }

with W(n,0) = 0 for all n > 0 and W(1,k) = k for all k. It is easy to solve this equation iteratively by systematically increasing the values of n and k.

Faster DP solution using a different parametrization 
Notice that the above solution takes  time with a DP solution. Also, by storing the optimal  for each cell in the DP table and referring to its value for the previous cell, the optimal  for each cell can be found in constant time, improving it to  time. However, there is an even faster solution that involves a different parametrization of the problem:

Let  be the total number of floors such that the eggs break when dropped from the th floor (The example above is equivalent to taking ).

Let  be the minimum floor from which the egg must be dropped to be broken.

Let  be the maximum number of values of  that are distinguishable using  tries and  eggs.

Then  for all .

Let  be the floor from which the first egg is dropped in the optimal strategy.

Therefore, .

Then the problem is equivalent to finding the minimum  such that .

To do so, we could compute  in order of increasing , which would take  time.

But the recurrence relation can in fact be solved, giving , which can be computed in  time using the identity  for all .

Matrix chain multiplication 

Matrix chain multiplication is a well-known example that demonstrates utility of dynamic programming. For example,  engineering applications often have to multiply a chain of matrices. It is not surprising to find matrices of large dimensions, for example 100×100. Therefore, our task is to multiply matrices . Matrix multiplication is not commutative, but is associative; and we can multiply only two matrices at a time. So, we can multiply this chain of matrices in many different ways, for example:

 

 

 

and so on. There are numerous ways to multiply this chain of matrices. They will all produce the same final result, however they will take more or less time to compute, based on which particular matrices are multiplied. If matrix A has dimensions m×n and matrix B has dimensions n×q, then matrix C=A×B will have dimensions m×q, and will require m*n*q scalar multiplications (using a simplistic matrix multiplication algorithm for purposes of illustration).

For example, let us multiply matrices A, B and C. Let us assume that their dimensions are m×n, n×p, and p×s, respectively. Matrix A×B×C will be of size m×s and can be calculated in two ways shown below:

 Ax(B×C)    This order of matrix multiplication will require nps + mns scalar multiplications.  
 (A×B)×C    This order of matrix multiplication will require mnp + mps scalar calculations.

Let us assume that m = 10, n = 100, p = 10 and s = 1000. So, the first way to multiply the chain will require 1,000,000 + 1,000,000 calculations. The second way will require only 10,000+100,000 calculations. Obviously, the second way is faster, and we should multiply the matrices using that arrangement of parenthesis.

Therefore, our conclusion is that the order of parenthesis matters, and that our task is to find the optimal order of parenthesis.

At this point, we have several choices, one of which is to design a dynamic programming algorithm that will split the problem into overlapping problems and calculate the optimal arrangement of parenthesis. The dynamic programming solution is presented below.

Let's call m[i,j] the minimum number of scalar multiplications needed to multiply a chain of matrices from matrix i to matrix j (i.e. Ai × .... × Aj, i.e. i<=j). We split the chain at some matrix k, such that i <= k < j, and try to find out which combination produces minimum m[i,j].

The formula is:

        if i = j, m[i,j]= 0
        if i < j, m[i,j]= min over all possible values of k  
where k ranges from i to j − 1.

 is the row dimension of matrix i,
 is the column dimension of matrix k,
 is the column dimension of matrix j.

This formula can be coded as shown below, where input parameter "chain" is the chain of matrices, i.e. :

 function OptimalMatrixChainParenthesis(chain)
     n = length(chain)
     for i = 1, n
         m[i,i] = 0    // Since it takes no calculations to multiply one matrix
     for len = 2, n
         for i = 1, n - len + 1
             j = i + len -1
             m[i,j] = infinity      // So that the first calculation updates
             for k = i, j-1
                 
                 if q < m[i, j]     // The new order of parentheses is better than what we had
                     m[i, j] = q    // Update
                     s[i, j] = k    // Record which k to split on, i.e. where to place the parenthesis

So far, we have calculated values for all possible , the minimum number of calculations to multiply a chain from matrix i to matrix j, and we have recorded the corresponding "split point".

This algorithm will produce "tables" m[, ] and s[, ] that will have entries for all possible values of i and j. The final solution for the entire chain is m[1, n], with corresponding split at s[1, n]. Unraveling the solution will be recursive, starting from the top and continuing until we reach the base case, i.e. multiplication of single matrices.

Therefore, the next step is to actually split the chain, i.e. to place the parenthesis where they (optimally) belong. For this purpose we could use the following algorithm:

 function PrintOptimalParenthesis(s, i, j)
     if i = j
         print "A"i
     else
         print "(" 
         PrintOptimalParenthesis(s, i, s[i, j]) 
         PrintOptimalParenthesis(s, s[i, j] + 1, j) 
         print ")"

Of course, this algorithm is not useful for actual multiplication. This algorithm is just a user-friendly way to see what the result looks like.

To actually multiply the matrices using the proper splits, we need the following algorithm:
   function MatrixChainMultiply(chain from 1 to n)       // returns the final matrix, i.e. A1×A2×... ×An
      OptimalMatrixChainParenthesis(chain from 1 to n)   // this will produce s[ . ] and m[ . ] "tables"
      OptimalMatrixMultiplication(s, chain from 1 to n)  // actually multiply

   function OptimalMatrixMultiplication(s, i, j)   // returns the result of multiplying a chain of matrices from Ai to Aj in optimal way
      if i < j
         // keep on splitting the chain and multiplying the matrices in left and right sides
         LeftSide = OptimalMatrixMultiplication(s, i, s[i, j])
         RightSide = OptimalMatrixMultiplication(s, s[i, j] + 1, j)
         return MatrixMultiply(LeftSide, RightSide) 
      else if i = j
         return Ai   // matrix at position i
      else 
         print "error, i <= j must hold"

    function MatrixMultiply(A, B)    // function that multiplies two matrices
      if columns(A) = rows(B) 
         for i = 1, rows(A)
            for j = 1, columns(B)
               C[i, j] = 0
               for k = 1, columns(A)
                   C[i, j] = C[i, j] + A[i, k]*B[k, j] 
               return C 
      else 
          print "error, incompatible dimensions."

History 
The term dynamic programming was originally used in the 1940s by Richard Bellman to describe the process of solving problems where one needs to find the best decisions one after another.  By 1953, he refined this to the modern meaning, referring specifically to nesting smaller decision problems inside larger decisions,  and the field was thereafter recognized by the IEEE as a systems analysis and engineering topic.  Bellman's contribution is remembered in the name of the Bellman equation, a central result of dynamic programming which restates an optimization problem in recursive form.

Bellman explains the reasoning behind the term dynamic programming in his autobiography, Eye of the Hurricane: An Autobiography:

The word dynamic was chosen by Bellman to capture the time-varying aspect of the problems, and because it sounded impressive. The word programming referred to the use of the method to find an optimal program, in the sense of a military schedule for training or logistics.  This usage is the same as that in the phrases linear programming and mathematical programming, a synonym for mathematical optimization.

The above explanation of the origin of the term is lacking. As Russell and Norvig in their book have written, referring to the above story: "This cannot be strictly true, because his first paper using the term (Bellman, 1952) appeared before Wilson became Secretary of Defense in 1953." Also, there is a comment in a speech by Harold J. Kushner, where he remembers Bellman. Quoting Kushner as he speaks of Bellman: "On the other hand, when I asked him the same question, he replied that he was trying to upstage Dantzig's linear programming by adding dynamic. Perhaps both motivations were true."

Algorithms that use dynamic programming 

 Recurrent solutions to lattice models for protein-DNA binding
 Backward induction as a solution method for finite-horizon discrete-time dynamic optimization problems
 Method of undetermined coefficients can be used to solve the Bellman equation in infinite-horizon, discrete-time, discounted, time-invariant dynamic optimization problems
 Many string algorithms including longest common subsequence, longest increasing subsequence, longest common substring, Levenshtein distance (edit distance)
 Many algorithmic problems on graphs can be solved efficiently for graphs of bounded treewidth or bounded clique-width by using dynamic programming on a tree decomposition of the graph.
 The Cocke–Younger–Kasami (CYK) algorithm which determines whether and how a given string can be generated by a given context-free grammar
 Knuth's word wrapping algorithm that minimizes raggedness when word wrapping text
 The use of transposition tables and refutation tables in computer chess
 The Viterbi algorithm (used for hidden Markov models, and particularly in part of speech tagging)
 The Earley algorithm (a type of chart parser)
 The Needleman–Wunsch algorithm and other algorithms used in bioinformatics, including sequence alignment, structural alignment, RNA structure prediction
 Floyd's all-pairs shortest path algorithm
 Optimizing the order for chain matrix multiplication
 Pseudo-polynomial time algorithms for the subset sum, knapsack and partition problems
 The dynamic time warping algorithm for computing the global distance between two time series
 The Selinger (a.k.a. System R) algorithm for relational database query optimization
 De Boor algorithm for evaluating B-spline curves
 Duckworth–Lewis method for resolving the problem when games of cricket are interrupted
 The value iteration method for solving Markov decision processes
 Some graphic image edge following selection methods such as the "magnet" selection tool in Photoshop
 Some methods for solving interval scheduling problems
 Some methods for solving the travelling salesman problem, either exactly (in exponential time) or approximately (e.g. via the bitonic tour)
 Recursive least squares method
 Beat tracking in music information retrieval
 Adaptive-critic training strategy for artificial neural networks
 Stereo algorithms for solving the correspondence problem used in stereo vision
 Seam carving (content-aware image resizing)
 The Bellman–Ford algorithm for finding the shortest distance in a graph
 Some approximate solution methods for the linear search problem
 Kadane's algorithm for the maximum subarray problem
 Optimization of electric generation expansion plans in the Wein Automatic System Planning (WASP) package

See also

References

Further reading 
. An accessible introduction to dynamic programming in economics. MATLAB code for the book . 
. Includes an extensive bibliography of the literature in the area, up to the year 1954.
. Dover paperback edition (2003), .
. Especially pp. 323–69.
.
.
.

.

External links 

 A Tutorial on Dynamic programming
 MIT course on algorithms - Includes 4 video lectures on DP, lectures 19-22
 Applied Mathematical Programming by Bradley, Hax, and Magnanti, Chapter 11
 More DP Notes
 King, Ian, 2002 (1987), "A Simple Introduction to Dynamic Programming in Macroeconomic Models." An introduction to dynamic programming as an important tool in economic theory.
 Dynamic Programming: from novice to advanced A TopCoder.com article by Dumitru on Dynamic Programming
 Algebraic Dynamic Programming – a formalized framework for dynamic programming, including an entry-level course to DP, University of Bielefeld
 Dreyfus, Stuart, "Richard Bellman on the birth of Dynamic Programming."
 Dynamic programming tutorial
  A Gentle Introduction to Dynamic Programming and the Viterbi Algorithm
 Tabled Prolog BProlog, XSB, SWI-Prolog
 IFORS online interactive dynamic programming modules including, shortest path, traveling salesman, knapsack, false coin, egg dropping, bridge and torch, replacement, chained matrix products, and critical path problem.

 
Optimization algorithms and methods
Equations
Systems engineering
Optimal control